University of London Boat Club (ULBC; boat code ULO) is the rowing club for the University of London and its member institutions, many of which also have their own boat clubs. The club has its boathouse on the Thames in Chiswick, London, UK. It is a designated High-Performance Programme funded by British Rowing.

History

The University of London Boat Club was formed in 1921.

Olympians

ULBC has been represented at every Olympic Games since 1960:

 1960 Rome – Coxed Pair: S.Farquharson, J.R. Reeves
 1964 Tokyo – Coxless Pair: S.Farquharson, J.D.Lee
 1968 Mexico – Eight: M.M.K.Cooper, B.L.A.Carter, M.Malpass, R.D.Yarrow, P.G.Knapp, P.J.Wright, A.A.Bayles, P.L.Thomas, cox, T.Kirk
 1972 Munich – Coxless Pair: M.M.K. Cooper. Coxed Four: R.W.J. Massara
 1976 Montreal – Coxless Four: N.A.Keron, D.G.H.Townsend
 1980 Moscow – Coxless Four: D.G.H.Townsend, M.Cross (Bronze)
 1984 Los Angeles – Coxless Four: R.G.McBudgett, M.Cross (Gold). Women's Eight: N.V.Boyes, A.Callaway. Coxed Pair: A.M.Genziani
 1988 Seoul – Eight: A.Obholzer, P.Beaumont, T.Dillon, S.Hassan, S.Jeffries. Coxed Four: M.Cross, J.M. Maxey, V. Thomas
 1992 Barcelona – Coxless Four: S.Hassan. Eight: M.Cross, T.C.Foster, J.D.C.Walker, cox A.Ellison. Women's Eight: A.Patterson
 1996 Atlanta – Coxless Four: T.C. Foster, R.Obholzer (Bronze). Eight: M.H.W. Parish, G. Smith, J.D.C. Walker. Lwt Coxless Four: M.R, Rowand Republic of South Africa
 2000 Sydney – Single Scull: M.Wells. Coxless Four: T.C.Foster (Gold). Lwt Coxless Four: M.R, Rowand for Rep. South Africa. Women's Double: F.Houghton. Women's Eight: A.Beever
 2004 Athens – Double Scull: M.Wells. Quad Scull: P.Wells. Eight: C.Cormack. Women's Quad Scull: F.Houghton (Silver)
 2008 Beijing – Double Scull: M.Wells (Bronze). Women's Quad Scull: F.Houghton (Silver). Women's Eight: J.Eddie, C.Greves
 2012 London – Quad Scull: M.Wells. Women's Quad Scull: F.Houghton, M.Wilson. Women's Eight: J.Eddie, C.Greves
 2016 Rio de Janeiro – Men's Eight: P. Bennett (Gold). Women's Eight: J.Eddie, C.Greves,  F.Houghton, M.Wilson (Silver).
 2016 Paralympic Games, Rio de Janeiro – LTA Mixed 4+: J. Fox (Gold).
 2021 Tokyo - Women's Quad Scull: C. Hodgkins-Byrne. Women's Eight: M. Horn, S. Parfett. Women's Lightweight Double Scull: Emily Craig. Men's Coxless Four: O. Cook. Men's Eight: H. Fieldman. 
 2021 Paralympic Games- LTA Mixed 4+: J. Fox (Gold)

Coaching team
 Chief coach: Antony Smith
 Senior coach: Tom Gale
 S&C: Max Honigsbaum

Notable members and alumni

 Katie Greves – World Rowing Championship 2007 & 2011 Bronze, Olympic 2008 & 2012 finalist W8+, Olympic 2016 Silver
 Frances Houghton – Four times World Champion and double Olympic silver medallist, 2004–2010 – women's quadruple scull
 Nathaniel Reilly-O'Donnell – World Champion 2015 in Men's Coxed Pair, World Champion 2014 in Men's Eight, Silver in 2011. World U23 Championships 2010 Silver M4-, World U23 Championships 2009 Bronze M8+, World Junior Championships 2006 Gold M4- 
 Tim Foster – Olympic Gold Medalist in 2000
 Cameron Nichol – World Rowing Championship 2010 & 2011 Silver. (Learnt to row at University of London).
 Richard Budgett – Olympic Gold Medalist in 1984.
 Matt Wells – Olympic Bronze Medalist in 2008
 Paul Bennett – Olympic Gold Medalist in 2016, World Champion 2014 & 2015 in the Men's Eight. (Learnt to row at University of London).
 Jessica Eddie – World Rowing Championship 2007 & 2011 Bronze, Olympic 2008 & 2012 finalist W8+
 Ann Redgrave – Olympic rower and Chief Medical Officer to GB Rowing

Member institution boat clubs
Some of the University of London's member institutions have their own boat clubs. Members of these clubs can try out for a place in the University of London Boat Club squad.

King's College London Boat Club  
London School of Economics Rowing Club 
Queen Mary, University of London Boat Club  
Royal Free and University College Medical School Boat Club  
Royal Holloway University of London Boat Club  
Royal Veterinary College Boat Club 
St Bartholomew's and the Royal London Hospitals' Boat Club 
St George's Hospital Boat Club  
University College London Boat Club  

The senior crews of these institutions compete annually for the Allom Cup, while the medical schools take part in the United Hospitals bumps races. Both of these contests take place on the Tideway.

Alumni rowing

The club shares its facilities with an alumni club, UL Tyrian Club. The Tyrian Club has won multiple titles at the Henley Royal Regatta, the most recent being the Wyfold Challenge Cup in 2013.

In 2015 UL Tyrian won events at Henley Masters Regattas and at the Head Of The Charles Regatta, in the USA. In 2019 a UL Tyrian won events at Henley Town & Visitors Regatta and UL Tyrian competed at the World Costal Championships in Hong Kong.  The blade colours are purple and white; kit: purple.

Honours

ULBC won the Victor Ludorum at the British Universities and Colleges Sport regatta for the first (and,  only) time in 2014.

Henley Royal Regatta

British Rowing Championship

See also
Rowing on the River Thames
University rowing (UK)

Notes and references
Notes 
  
References

External links
University of London Boat Club
United Hospitals Boat Club

Boat Club
Tideway Rowing clubs
Rowing clubs in England
London
Rowing clubs of the River Thames
1921 establishments in England
Sports clubs established in 1921
Student sport in London